Ryan Mueller (born April 30, 1991) is an American football defensive end, linebacker, and fullback for the Arlington Renegades of the XFL. He played college football at Kansas State University. He played for the Hamilton Tiger-Cats of the Canadian Football League (CFL) in 2017.

College career
Mueller began his Division I NCAA college football career at Kansas State University as an unrecruited walk-on and went on to become an All-American, 4-year letterman, starter at defensive end and team captain. He ranks 5th in school history in career sacks.

Kansas State Wildcats football head coach Bill Snyder said this about Mueller:

Professional career

San Diego Chargers
He was signed by the San Diego Chargers as an undrafted free agent in 2015.

Philadelphia Eagles
It was announced that he was signed by the Eagles on April 1, 2016, as a fullback, which he played in high school and occasionally in college.

Hamilton Tiger-Cats
Mueller signed with the Hamilton Tiger-Cats of the Canadian Football League on April 17, 2017. He was released during final roster cuts on June 18, but was re-signed to the team's practice roster on August 14. He was promoted to the active roster on October 5, but was moved back down to the practice roster on October 31. He was signed to a future contract on November 4. He was transferred to the retired list on April 26, 2018. After the 2018 season, he was removed from the retired list on February 20, 2019, when his contract expired.

New York Guardians
In October 2019, Mueller was drafted by the New York Guardians in the open phase of the 2020 XFL Draft. He had his contract terminated when the league suspended operations on April 10, 2020. He was credited with the Defensive Play of the Year after batting a pass up into the air and then catching it, breaking two tackle attempts, and returning it 33 yards for a touchdown.

Arlington Renegades 
Mueller was selected by the Arlington Renegades of the XFL on November 17, 2022. He signed with the team on March 15, 2023.

Personal
He is the son of Steve and Valerie Mueller and has two sisters, Katheryn and Caroline.

References

External links
 http://www.chargers.com/team/players/roster/ryan-mueller
 http://www.kstatesports.com/sport/m-footbl/2015/roster/5589bf3ae4b09d6fde8f35a3
 http://m.kstatesports.com/sport/m-footbl/2017/roster/5589bf3ae4b09d6fde8f35a3

Living people
American football linebackers
American football fullbacks
Philadelphia Eagles players
San Diego Chargers players
Sportspeople from Morris County, New Jersey
Kansas State Wildcats football players
Players of American football from New Jersey
People from Morristown, New Jersey
Hamilton Tiger-Cats players
New York Guardians players
Arlington Renegades players
1991 births